The 2017–18 Georgia Tech Yellow Jackets men's basketball team represented the Georgia Institute of Technology during the 2017–18 NCAA Division I men's basketball season. They were led by second-year head coach Josh Pastner and played their home games at Hank McCamish Pavilion as members of the Atlantic Coast Conference. They finished the season 13–19, 6–12 in ACC play to finish in 13th place. They lost in the first round of the ACC tournament to Boston College.

Previous season
The Yellow Jackets finished the 2016–17 season 21–16, 8–10 in ACC play to finish in 11th place. They lost in the first round of the ACC tournament to Pittsburgh. The Yellow Jackets received an invitation to the National Invitation Tournament where they defeated Indiana, Belmont, and Ole Miss to advance to the semifinals at Madison Square Garden. At MSG, they defeated Cal State Bakersfield before losing in the championship game to TCU.

Departures

Incoming transfers

2017 recruiting class

2018 Recruiting class

Roster

Schedule and results

|-
!colspan=9 style=| Exhibition

|-
!colspan=9 style=| Regular season

|-
!colspan=9 style=| ACC tournament

References

Georgia Tech Yellow Jackets men's basketball seasons
Georgia Tech
2017 in sports in Georgia (U.S. state)